Dmitry Oskarovich Ott (February 23, 1855, with Plokhino, Zhizdrinsky Uyezd, Kaluga Governorate (now in Ulyanovsky District, Kaluga Oblast) - June 17, 1929, Leningrad) was a Russia and the Soviet obstetrician; Life obstetrician (1895) in the reign of Emperor Nicholas II.

Biography 
The first son of the vice-governor of the Novgorod province Oscar Fyodorovich Ott (1828-1883).

In 1874 he graduated from the Novgorod school and entered the St. Petersburg Medical-Surgical Academy, from which he graduated in 1879.

Professor of Clinical Institute of Grand Duchess Elena Pavlovna, since 1893 director of clinical obstetrics Imperial Institute (now bears his name), and until 1906 Women's Medical Institute in St. Petersburg. For the first time almost proved and theoretically substantiated the efficacy of intravenous infusions of saline bloodless childbirth. His efforts in 1913 began to be used in gynecology radium. The founder of a new direction in operative gynecology. He played for laparotomy vaginal way, actively introduced asepsis. Developed methods of surgical treatment of prolapse and loss of sexual organs. Constructed a number of new medical instruments (lighting Mirrors vaginal operations, etc.). For the first time I had a laparoscopic surgery.

He was buried at Novodevichy Cemetery (Saint Petersburg).

Wife: Olga Nikolayevna. Their daughter Alexandra was born on 4 May 1880.

References

External links 
 Отт Дмитрий Оскарович (1855—1929)
 Современная Россия в портретах и биографиях выдающихся деятелей. — СПб., 1904.
 Биография Д. О. Отта на сайте НИИ акушерства и гинекологии им. Д. О. Отта

1855 births
1929 deaths
People from Kaluga Oblast
People from Zhizdrinsky Uyezd
Russian gynaecologists
19th-century physicians from the Russian Empire
Soviet obstetricians and gynaecologists
Burials at Novodevichy Cemetery (Saint Petersburg)